The Winchester 400 is a 400-lap short-track super late model stock car race held each fall at the Winchester Speedway, a half-mile long paved oval motor racetrack in Winchester, Indiana, United States. Held annually since 1970, the Winchester 400 started off as an American Speed Association event. Later it became part of the NASCAR Southeast Series from 1992 to 1998. It returned to the ASA National Tour from 2000 to 2002. The event is sanctioned by the ARCA/CRA Super Series since 2003, and in 2023 it will be co-sanctioned by the new ASA STARS National Tour.

Billed as the "World's Fastest 1/2 mile", Winchester's 37 degree banking are some of the steepest in motorsports and the reason for the high speeds. The track has permanent seating for approximately 4000 spectators.  The race has served as a launching point for the careers of several young drivers including former winners Rusty Wallace, Mark Martin, Mike Eddy, and Ted Musgrave.

History 

Reference (for 1970 - 2013 winners):

References

External links
 Winchester Speedway official website
 CRA Super Series official website
 Winchester Speedway at Racing Reference
 Winchester 400 at The Third Turn

Stock car races
Motorsport in Indiana
Recurring sporting events established in 1970
1970 establishments in Indiana